Abbotsleigh is a hamlet in the county of Devon, England. Abbotsleigh is in the civil parish of Blackawton, within the district council of South Hams in Devon.

References

Villages in South Hams